Süleyman Araz (born 1 August 1995) is a Turkish archer competing in men's compound events. He won the silver medal in the men's team compound event at the 2019 World Archery Championships held in 's-Hertogenbosch, Netherlands.

In 2019, Araz won, alongside Muhammed Yetim, the gold medal in the men's team compound event at the 2019 Summer Universiade held in Naples, Italy. In the same year, he also won the silver medal in the men's team event at the competition held in Antalya, Turkey as part of the 2019 Archery World Cup.

References

External links 
 

Living people
1995 births
Place of birth missing (living people)
Turkish male archers
World Archery Championships medalists
Universiade medalists in archery
Universiade gold medalists for Turkey
Medalists at the 2019 Summer Universiade
21st-century Turkish people